The NFL 2000s All-Decade Team is composed of outstanding performers in the National Football League in the ten years spanning 2000–2009.  Only a player or coach's performance in the 2000s is used as criteria for voting.

The full team was announced on January 31, 2010 during the pregame show for the 2010 Pro Bowl.  The names of the twelve all-decade honorees who participated in the 2010 Pro Bowl had been released earlier in the week.

Willie Roaf, Larry Allen, and Warren Sapp were previously named to the 1990s All-Decade Team. Tom Brady, Julius Peppers, Shane Lechler, Devin Hester and Bill Belichick were later named to the 2010s All-Decade Team.

Selection process
The team is chosen by members of the Hall of Fame Selection Committee.  This committee consists of one media member from each NFL market (two for New York/ New Jersey owing to the market's two teams), a representative from the Pro Football Writers of America and 11 "at-large" delegates (primarily national sportswriters) for a total of 44 voters.  These voters are asked to select two coaches and a total of 54 players, broken out as follows: two quarterbacks, four running backs, two fullbacks, four wide receivers, two tight ends, four offensive tackles, four guards, two centers, four defensive ends, four defensive tackles, six linebackers, four cornerbacks, four safeties, two placekickers, two punters, two kick returners, two punt returners.

Among the voters who have revealed their individual selections for the team are Alex Marvez (Fox Sports), Rick Gosselin (The Dallas Morning News), and Peter King (Sports Illustrated).

The team
Note 1: Players are listed alphabetically within first and second teams
Note 2: Only teams for which a player played in a game from 2000–2009 are listed.
Note 3: Under "Hall of Fame?" if a year is listed, i.e., "e-2022", that is the year player is eligible for the Pro Football Hall of Fame.

Offense

Defense

Special teams

Coach

See also
Sports Illustrated NFL All-Decade Team (2009)

References

External links
Top 10 players of the decade (video). December 31, 2009. NFL Enterprises LLC

National Football League All-Decade Teams
National Football League records and achievements
Foot
Foot
Foot
National Football League lists